Amor Prohibido is a 1994 album by Selena.

Amor prohibido (Forbidden love) may also refer to:

Music 
 "Amor Prohibido" (song), the title track of Selena's album
 Amor Prohibido Tour, the 1994-95 tour of Selena
 Amor Prohibido (Daniela Romo album), a 1984 album, or title track
 "Amor Prohibido", a song by Baby Rasta & Gringo
 "Amor Prohibido", a song by Nicky Jam from Fénix
 "Amor Prohibido", a song by Prince Royce from Five
 "Amor Prohibido", a song by Los Rieleros del Norte

Films and television 
 Amor prohibido (film), a 1958 film by Luis César Amadori
 Amor prohibido, a 1944 film directed by Arcady Boytler
 Amor prohibido (TV series), 1979 Televisa telenovela